Australia the Lucky Cunt is an extended play by Australian alternative rock band TISM. It was released on 3 September 1993. The title is a play on the expression "The Lucky Country". 

The EP was withdrawn from sale one week after release following legal action being taken by artist and designer Ken Done due to the original cover art, which shows a koala with a syringe in its mouth. Subsequently, Done obtained an injunction order banning the sale of the EP. The EP was subsequently re-released in November 1993 under the title "Censored Due To Legal Advice", with new cover art depicting an incident where Irish singer Sinéad O'Connor tore up a picture of Pope John Paul II on Saturday Night Live (with the image of the Pope being altered to the TISM logo).

The EP was later deleted from the Shock Records catalogue, and its tracks were added to the 1997 reissue of Beasts of Suburban.

Track listing

Release history

References

TISM albums
1993 EPs
Shock Records EPs